Charlotte State Forest is a state forest located in Charlotte County, Virginia near the town of Drakes Branch.

History
The forest was formerly owned by Thomas B. Stanley, governor of the Commonwealth of Virginia from 1954-1958. Prior to its acquisition by The Conservation Fund in 2019, the land was owned by the Stanley Land and Lumber Corporation, which harvested timber to make furniture.

Description
Located off Saxkey Road, a Virginia Scenic Byway, the area includes portions along 13 miles of the Roanoke Creek and Wards Ford Creek, tributaries of the Roanoke River. The forest offers critical habitat for the endangered northern long-eared bat (Myotis septentrionalis) and the riparian areas provide undisturbed nesting and foraging habitat for waterfowl. Traditional outdoor recreation activities such as hiking, fishing, and birdwatching are available for visitors. The forest will continue to be sustainably harvested for timber.

See also
 List of Virginia state forests
 List of Virginia state parks

References

External links 
 Charlotte State Forest
 Land Secured for Virginia's newest state forest
 New State Forest is Charlotte County's First Publicly Accessible Land

Virginia state forests
2021 establishments in Virginia
Protected areas of Charlotte County, Virginia
Protected areas established in 2021